20th Anniversary Tour 1986 is a live album by the Monkees recorded during their 20th anniversary tour in 1986. To date, it is the only known complete concert recorded during this era. The recording was available at 1987 tour stops in double-LP and cassette formats, though a planned 1988 retail release by Rhino Records was ultimately scrapped. The record credited the artists as Davy Jones, Micky Dolenz, Peter Tork to avoid paying royalties to Arista Records who owned the Monkees trademark at the time, though the band's logo is visible on the sleeve. A limited-edition CD was released in 1994 under the title Live! by the group's fan club in Nashville, and was sold at concerts during their 1996 tour.

Two of the album's tracks were used as B-sides on Monkees singles released in 1987 by Rhino Records. The Peter Tork-penned "MGBGT" backs "Heart and Soul", and is the only of the Monkees' U.S. singles to feature Tork as the sole lead vocalist. "(I'll) Love You Forever", written by Davy Jones, appears opposite "Every Step of the Way".

The album was recorded during the final two days of the Monkees' 1986 North American tour, at the Civic Center Arena in Charleston, West Virginia on December 1, and at Stabler Arena in Bethlehem, Pennsylvania on December 3. The idea of a tour to celebrate the Monkees' 20th anniversary came from promoter David Fishof. Initially, all four of the Monkees, including Mike Nesmith, agreed to a 20-date tour. While Tork and Jones were embarking on a warm-up tour in Australia, MTV unexpectedly ran a marathon of the Monkees' TV series, introducing the music to a new generation and persuading organizers to add over 100 dates to the tour. The expansion of the tour led Nesmith to bow out, and he appeared only for the encore at one show in Los Angeles. Ultimately, the 20th anniversary tour became one of the most profitable tours of 1986.

Track listing

Personnel 

Davy Jones – vocals, percussion
Micky Dolenz – vocals, electric drums, guitar
Peter Tork – vocals, guitar, banjo
Dusty Hanvey – guitar
Larry Nelson – keyboards
Mark Clarke – bass
Eddie Zyne – drums
Kevin Osborne – trombone
John Leslie – saxophone
Lon Seaman – trumpet
Jim O'Connor – trumpet

Sources:

Production notes 

Davy Jones – producer
Micky Dolenz – producer
Peter Tork – mixing, producer
Mark Clarke – mixing
Patti Joblon – production coordinator
Jay Messina – live recording engineer, mix engineer
Greg Calbi – mastering engineer
Frank Pekoc – assistant engineer
Steve Marcantonio – additional engineering
Michael G. Bush – cover photos (1987 release)
Henry Diltz – cover photo (1994 release)

Mixed at Record Plant Studios in New York City.

Mastered at Sterling Sound in New York City.

Sources:

References 

The Monkees live albums
1987 live albums
Rhino Records live albums